Chartoscirta elegantula  is a Palearctic shore bug widespread in marshes or at the margins of rivers and lakes. Adult length is 3.5-4.0 mm. It is an agile ambush predator of small invertebrates on the ground or in peat moss. The adult animals hibernate often far from their summer habitats in dry material on the ground in moss or dry leaf litter.

Chartoscirta elegantula  occurs in Northern and Central Europe, the Northern Mediterranean, then East to Japan. Also found in the Middle East and India.

References 

 Ekkehard Wachmann, Albert Melber, Jürgen Deckert: Wanzen. Band 3: Pentatomomorpha I: Aradoidea (Rindenwanzen), Lygaeoidea (Bodenwanzen u. a.), Pyrrhocoroidea (Feuerwanzen) und Coreoidea (Randwanzen u. a.). (= Die Tierwelt Deutschlands und der angrenzenden Meeresteile nach ihren Merkmalen und nach ihrer Lebensweise. 78. Teil). Goecke & Evers, Keltern 2007, S. 95f.

Saldoidini
Hemiptera of Europe
Insects described in 1807